Since its inception in 2004, the 2010 Selangor FA Season is Selangor FA's 5th season playing soccer in the Malaysia Super League. 

Selangor FA began their season on January 10, 2010. They will also compete in two domestic cups; The FA Cup Malaysia and Malaysia Cup.

Malaysia Super League

Top goalscorers
Including matches played on n/a; Source: FIFA: Malaysia Super League Scorers

Malaysia FA Cup

First round
Selangor had a first round bye.

Second round

The first leg matches will be played on 16 February 2010, with the second legs to be held on 20 February 2010.

Quarter-finals

The first leg matches will be played on 9 March 2010, with the second legs to be held on 20 March 2010.

Semi-finals
The first leg matches will be played on 30 March 2010, with the second legs to be held on 3 April 2010.

Malaysia Cup

Group stage

Group D

Knockout stage

Bracket

 Aggregate 2–2. Johor FC won on away-goal rules.

References

Selangor
Selangor FA